Kenneth Albert Schmied (July 11, 1911 – April 5, 1973), a Republican, served as Mayor of Louisville, Kentucky from 1965 until 1969. He was the last Republican to have held the office.

The 1969 elections saw Democrat Frank W. Burke win the mayor's office.

Schmied is buried in Cave Hill Cemetery in Louisville.

References

External Links

Mayors of Louisville, Kentucky
1911 births
1990 deaths
20th-century American politicians
Burials at Cave Hill Cemetery